In civil engineering a shaft is an underground vertical or inclined passageway. Shafts are often entered through a manhole and closed by a manhole cover. They are constructed for a number of reasons including:

 For the construction of a tunnel
 For ventilation of a tunnel or underground structure, aka ventilation shaft
 As a drop shaft for a sewerage or water tunnel
 For access to a tunnel or underground structure, also as an escape route

Construction
There are a number of methods for the construction of shafts, the most significant being:

 The use of sheet piles, diaphragm walls or bored piles to construct a square or rectangular braced shaft
 The use of segmental lining installed by underpinning or caisson sunk to form a circular shaft
 Incremental excavation with a shotcrete circular or elliptical lining
 Incremental excavation supported by shotcrete, rock bolts, cable anchors and steel sets or ribs

Shafts can be sunk either dry or for methods such as the caisson method they can be sunk wet. Sinking a dry shaft means that any water that flows into the excavation is pumped out to leave no significant standing or flowing water in the base of the shaft. When wet sinking a shaft the shaft is allowed to flood and the muck is excavated out of the base of the shaft underwater using a grab on the end of a crane or similar excavation method. Because the shaft is flooded, the lining can not be constructed at the excavation level of the shaft so this method only suits methods where the lining is installed before shaft sinking (such as the use of sheet piles) or where the lining is sunk down with the shaft such as the caisson method.

Civil engineering
Tunnel construction